The 1984 All-Ireland Under-21 Football Championship was the 21st staging of the All-Ireland Under-21 Football Championship since its establishment by the Gaelic Athletic Association in 1964.

Mayo entered the championship as defending champions.

On 26 August 1984, Cork won the championship following a 0-9 to 0-6 defeat of Mayo in the All-Ireland final. This was their fifth All-Ireland title overall and their first in three championship seasons.

Results

All-Ireland Under-21 Football Championship

Semi-finals

Finals

References

1984
All-Ireland Under-21 Football Championship